Bigna Schmidt (born Chur) is a Swiss Paralympic skier and swimmer. She represented Switzerland in various Paralympic alpine skiing competitions. She won a bronze medal during the 2016/2017 World Cup  .

Career 
She started training in alpine skiing in 2000 in Davos and you are coached by Gregory Chambaz, coach of the national team. She studied economics at the University of St. Gallen.  She suffered a knee injury in December 2017, which prevented her from participating in the 2018 Winter Paralympic Games in Pyeongchang.  

In December 2016, she won a medal at a World Cup in the giant slalom in St. Moritz. In the 2016/2017 edition of the Paralympic Alpine Ski World Cup in St. Moritz, she won the bronze medal in the giant slalom with a time of 1:54.01.

References

External links 

 Odfficial website

Swiss female alpine skiers
Year of birth missing (living people)
Living people